The Île-des-Chênes North Stars are a Canadian senior ice hockey team based out of Ile des Chenes, Manitoba.  The North Stars were 2003 Allan Cup champions and currently play in the Carillon Senior Hockey League.

History
Longtime members of the now-defunct senior/intermediate Hanover-Tache Hockey League until 2005, the North Stars began competing dually at the Senior A and AAA levels in 1996.  The North Stars competed as an independent Senior AAA club from 2005 to 2018 and dropped back to Senior A status upon joining the CSHL in 2020.

Allan Cup competition
The North Stars made their first Allan Cup appearance in 1998. They captured their first and only national championship at the 2003 Allan Cup in Dundas, Ontario. A member of this team was former National Hockey League player Pat Falloon.

In 2006, the North Stars relocated to Brandon, Manitoba for one season. This was followed by three seasons playing out of the T.G. Smith Centre in Steinbach, Manitoba, where they hosted the 2009 Allan Cup. The Steinbach North Stars roster that season included former NHL players Theoren Fleury and Greg Hawgood.

In 2010, the North Stars returned to Île des Chênes and attempted to qualify for the 2011 Allan Cup, but lost to their local rivals, the South East Prairie Thunder, in the provincial playdowns. The North Stars went on hiatus after the 2010–2011 season, but returned for the 2015–16 season to participate in the 2016 Allan Cup in Steinbach.

The 2003 Allan Cup championship team has been inducted into the Manitoba Hockey Hall of Fame under the team category.

Season-by-season

Allan Cup history

See also
List of ice hockey teams in Manitoba

References

External links 
Carillon Senior Hockey League website

2011 disestablishments in Manitoba

Ice hockey teams in Manitoba 
Senior ice hockey teams
Sports clubs disestablished in 2011
Ice hockey clubs established in 2015

Sport in Eastman Region, Manitoba